These are the Billboard magazine number-one albums of 1953, per the Billboard 200.

Chart history through August 22

Chart history August 29 to December 19 (no album chart)

Chart history December 26 to end of year

See also
1953 in music
List of number-one albums (United States)

References

1953
Unites States Albums